Londoner v. City and County of Denver, 210 U.S. 373 (1908), is a case in which the United States Supreme Court held that due process rights under the U.S. Constitution attach to administrative agency hearings that involve adjudication, but not to those that involve legislation.

Legal principles
Due process protections attach to government agency activities that are adjudicative in nature, but not to activities that are legislative in nature.

Facts and procedural posture
The provisions of the Denver (Defendant) city charter confer upon the city the power to make local improvements and to assess the cost upon property specially benefited. Londoner (Plaintiff) was provided with notice of the assessment, but there was no opportunity for a hearing, the notice only fixed a deadline for the filing of complaints and objection. Londoner brought suit against the city challenging the assessment of a tax for the cost of paving the street abutting his property on the grounds that he was denied due process of law.

Issue
Where a tax is to be assessed upon property owners, do those affected by the tax have the right to argue their side and support their allegations by proof?

Analysis
The due process protections of the 14th Amendment of the U.S. Constitution require a hearing and opportunity to be heard whenever the government wishes to violate a citizen's life, liberty, or property.  Due process rights attach to governmental activities that are adjudicative in nature, but not to activities that are legislative in nature.  In the context of taxation, a legislative body has the power to tax without affording citizens due process protections.  However, when the decision to tax particular individuals is made by a non-legislative body based on the individual facts and circumstances of a particular case, the decision becomes adjudicative in nature, and due process protections attach.  These due process protections do not require a full trial, but the mere opportunity to file a written statement is insufficient.  Due process in this context requires at least an opportunity to be heard in person and present evidence.  No such opportunity was given.  Therefore, the action violated due process, and the liens were void.

This case is one of the earliest to establish when an agency rulemaking process must submit to adjudication. While administrative agencies have wide discretion within the rulemaking context, there are many instances in which adjudication is required. Where complaints are particularized and specific facts are at issue, adjudication is preferable since it is within a judge's expertise to resolve matters involving personal rights.  Whereas, when there is a general grievance bearing on future policies, rulemaking is preferable because the expertise and familiarity of an agency within its field helps to inform them on such decisions.

Here, the law of Colorado denied landowners post-deprivation hearings, the right to be heard after an assessment of taxes had been made.  Thus, the right to a pre-deprivation hearing, allowing landowners to be heard prior to the assessment of taxes, was the only way in which the landowners could challenge the Government's actions depriving them of property.

See also
 List of United States Supreme Court cases, volume 210

External links

 

1908 in United States case law
United States administrative case law
United States civil due process case law
United States Supreme Court cases
United States Supreme Court cases of the Fuller Court
United States taxation and revenue case law
History of Denver
Legal history of Colorado